Kelvin Ponde is a Montserratian footballer who plays for Ideal SC in the Montserrat Championship. He started his career with Bata Falcons who also participate in the Montserrat Championship.

International career
Ponde made his senior debut for Montserrat on 29 February 2004 in a 13–0 away defeat to Bermuda.

References

Ideal SC players
Montserratian footballers
Montserrat international footballers
1985 births
Living people
Association football forwards
Association football midfielders